The Roman Catholic Archdiocese of Porto Velho is an archdiocese located in the city of Porto Velho in Brazil.

History
 1 May 1925: Established as Territorial Prelature of Porto Velho from the Diocese of Amazonas and Diocese of São Luíz de Cáceres
 16 October 1979: Promoted as Diocese of Porto Velho
 4 October 1982: Promoted as Metropolitan Archdiocese of Porto Velho

Bishops

Ordinaries, in reverse chronological order
 Archbishops of Porto Velho (Latin Rite), below
 Roque Paloschi (2015.10.14 - )
 Esmeraldo Barreto de Farias, Ist. del Prado (2011.11.30 - 2015.03.18), appointed Auxiliary Bishop of São Luís do Maranhão
  Moacyr Grechi, O.S.M. (1998.07.29 – 2011.11.30)
 José Martins da Silva, S.D.N. (1982.10.04 – 1997.09.03)
 Bishop of Porto Velho (Latin Rite), below
 João Batista Costa, S.D.B. (see below 1979.10.16 – 1982.06.09)
 Prelates of Porto Velho (Latin Rite), below
 João Batista Costa, S.D.B. (1946.10.01 – 1979.10.16 see above)
 Pedro Massa, S.D.B. (Apostolic Administrator 1925.07.25 – 1946.10.01)

Coadjutor bishop
Antônio Sarto, S.D.B. (1971-1982, including 1971-1979 as Coadjutor Prelate), did not succeed to see; appointed Bishop of Barra do Garças, Mato Grosso

Other priest of this diocese who became bishop
Antônio Fontinele de Melo, appointed Bishop of Humaitá, Amazonas in 2020

Suffragan dioceses
 Diocese of Cruzeiro do Sul
 Diocese of Guajará-Mirim
 Diocese of Humaitá
 Diocese of Ji-Paraná
 Diocese of Rio Branco
 Territorial Prelature of Lábrea

Sources
 GCatholic.org
 Catholic Hierarchy

Roman Catholic dioceses in Brazil
Roman Catholic ecclesiastical provinces in Brazil
 
Christian organizations established in 1925
Roman Catholic dioceses and prelatures established in the 20th century